This is the results breakdown of the local elections held in the Basque Country on 13 June 1999. The following tables show detailed results in the autonomous community's most populous municipalities, sorted alphabetically.

Overall

City control
The following table lists party control in the most populous municipalities, including provincial capitals (shown in bold). Gains for a party are displayed with the cell's background shaded in that party's colour.

Municipalities

Barakaldo
Population: 98,649

Basauri
Population: 48,107

Bilbao
Population: 358,467

Donostia-San Sebastián
Population: 178,229

Errenteria
Population: 39,376

Getxo
Population: 82,974

Irun
Population: 55,196

Portugalete
Population: 53,498

Santurtzi
Population: 48,962

Vitoria-Gasteiz
Population: 216,527

Juntas Generales

References

Basque Country
1999